John William Davis (10 April 1882 – 29 October 1963) was an English footballer who played in the Football League for Derby County; he was also a cricketer who played first-class cricket for Derbyshire in 1920.

Davis was born at Ironville, Derbyshire. He is recorded as having performed prodigiously for Quorn Cricket Club He played one match for Derbyshire during the 1920 season. This was in August against Essex when he made 8 and 1 in his two innings and made two catches. Davis was a right-hand batsman who played 2 innings in 1 first-class match making a total of 9.

Davis died at Ripley, Derbyshire at the age of 81.

References

1882 births
1963 deaths
English footballers
Association football forwards
English Football League players
Grimsby Town F.C. players
Derby County F.C. players
Ilkeston United F.C. players
Derbyshire cricketers
English cricketers
People from Ironville
Footballers from Derbyshire
Cricketers from Derbyshire